Essexford railway station was on the Great Northern Railway (Ireland) in the Republic of Ireland.

The Great Northern Railway (Ireland) opened the station on 1 October 1887.

It closed on 10 March 1947.

Routes

References

Disused railway stations in County Louth
Railway stations opened in 1887
Railway stations closed in 1947